Escadrille 12 of the French Air Force was formed in 1912 and known for introducing Nieuport aircraft to the World War I air combat.

History
Escadrille 12 was equipped initially with Nieuport IV.M two-seat monoplanes aircraft; hence its original designation as Escadrille N 12. It took the Nieuports into World War I, but was then re-equipped with Morane-Saulnier L monoplanes on 28 February 1915. In accordance with French custom, it was renamed Escadrille MS 12. By this time, the unit was assigned to V Armee of the French ground forces.

In September 1915, the escadrille re-equipped once again, with Nieuport 11 single seat fighters, and it once again became Escadrille N 12. In subsequent months, it would also acquire Nieuport 12 two seat fighters, Nieuport 16s, and Nieuport 17s.

On 8 July 1916, it was cited in orders. It moved to a new assignment with II Armee on 5 October 1916. On 1 November 1916, it was one of four escadrilles consolidated into Groupe de Combat 11, the other Nieuport escadrilles being Escadrilles N31, N48, and N57.

As a component of GC 11, the escadrille was reassigned to V Armee in April 1917. In July, GC 11 moved to 1er Armee in Flanders. On 16 September 1917, it was transferred to VI Armee. In December, it upgraded to SPADs and thus became Escadrille Spa12.

Groupe de Combat 11 joined Groupe de Combat 13 and Groupe de Combat 17 to form Escadre de Combat No. 2 on 27 February 1918. In turn, Escadre de Combat No. 2 was subsumed into the 1er Division Aerienne on 14 May 1918. On 16 May 1918, Escadrille Spa 12 was cited by General Philippe Pétain for its prowess in destroying 34 enemy aircraft and two observation balloons. On 28 May 1918, GC II was detached from Escadre de Combat No. 2 and assigned to support VI Armee and V Armee. On 23 September 1918, GC 11 was moved to IV Armee. They made their final move on 6 November, to VIII Armee. When the war ended five days later, Escadrille Spa12 had been credited with victories over 43 enemy aircraft and seven observation balloons.

The heritage of the Escadrille 12 continues in the present day French air force.

Commanding officers
 Escadrille N12, MS12, N12:
 Capitaine Aubry
 Capitaine Raymond de Pierre de Bernis: 12 May 1915 - 11 January 1918
 Lieutenant Armand de Turenne: 12 January 1918 - end of war
 Groupe de Combat 11
 Commandant Auguste le Reverend: 1 November 1916 - 24 January 1917
 Capitaine Edouard Duseigneur: 25 January 1917 - 19 June 1918
 Capitaine Marcel Bonnefay: 20 June 1918 -
 Escadre de Combat No. 2
 Chef de Bataillon Philippe Fequant: 27 February 1918
 1er Division Aerienne
 General Duval

Notable personnel
 Armand de Turenne
 Henri Languedoc
 Pierre Dufaur de Gavardie
 Joseph M. X. de Sévin

Aircraft
 Nieuport VI.M
 Nieuport 10
 Morane-Saulnier L: 28 February 1915
 Nieuport 11: September 1915
 Nieuport 12
 Nieuport 16
 Nieuport 17
 SPAD: December 1917

Endnotes

References 
 Franks, Norman; Frank W. Bailey. Over the Front: A Complete Record of the Fighter Aces and Units of the United States and French Air Services, 1914-1918 Grub Street, 1992. , .

Further reading 
 Bailey, Frank W., and Christophe Cony. French Air Service War Chronology, 1914-1918: Day-to-Day Claims and Losses by French Fighter, Bomber and Two-Seat Pilots on the Western Front. London: Grub Street, 2001.
 Davilla, James J., and Arthur M. Soltan. French Aircraft of the First World War. Stratford, CT: Flying Machines Press, 1997.
 Les escadrilles de l'aéronautique militaire française: symbolique et histoire, 1912-1920. Vincennes: Service historique de l'armée de l'air, 2004.

External links
 Escadrille N 12 - MS 12 - N12 - SPA 12

Military units and formations established in 1912
Squadrons of the French Service Aéronautique in World War I